Albardão Lighthouse is an active lighthouse located on a sandy strip known as Praia do Cassino, in the municipality of Santa Vitória do Palmar, Brazil on the South Atlantic Ocean; the lighthouse is one of the southernmost Brazilian lights.

History
The current lighthouse was built on project of Ernst Schaffer by the Christiani-Nielsen builder in 1948. The lighthouse is managed by Brazilian Navy and is identified by the country code number BR-4656.

Albardão Lighthouse is located in Hermenegildo Beach

References

External links
  Centro de Sinalização Náutica Almirante Moraes Rego

Lighthouses in Brazil